Shek Borkowski (born 30 January 1963) is a Polish women's association football manager who is currently the head coach of Puerto Rico Sol. He last managed the Puerto Rico women's national football team from 2017 to 2018. He was also the manager of Haiti from 2012 to 2017.

Known primarily for his prominence within women's soccer, Borkowski has won 7 league titles and 2 cups in 3 countries. He is the only Polish manager who won domestic titles in three different countries.

He is most notable for his success with FC Indiana where he won two WPSL titles and two US Open Cup titles. Borkowski was named the 2005 WPSL National Coach of the Year and received the 2008 Field Turf W-League Coach of the Year award.  
In 2009 he helped Zvezda-2005 to Russian Superior League title, and in 2010 led Zvezda to round 16 of the UEFA Women's Champions League.
In 2018/19, 2021 and 2022 he led Puerto Rico Sol FC to four consecutive Women's Liga Puerto Rico titles, winning 59 consecutive games.
Borkowski likes his teams to play with "good organisation and structure". He prefers his teams to control the game by being confident on the ball and assured when passing.

Managerial career
2018-: Puerto Rico Sol
2017-2018: Puerto Rico
2012–16: Haiti women's national football team, Haiti
2011–12: FC Indiana, USA
2009–2010: Zvezda-2005 Perm, Russia
2004–2009: FC Indiana, USA 
2000–2007: FC Indiana (Men), USA

Career statistics
Borkowski's Women's World Cup qualifying record.

Titles
In nine seasons of club management, Borkowski has led three different clubs (in USA, Russia and Puerto Rico) to 7 domestic league and 2 cup titles and UEFA Women's Champions League round of 16 qualification.

Russian Women's Supreme League (2009), Women's Premier Soccer League (2010), WPSL (2007), US Open Cup (2005, 2008)

Puerto Rico (women's)
Liga Puerto Rico Champions (2022)
Liga Puerto Rico Champions (2021)
Liga Puerto Rico Champions (2018/19)

Haiti
Caribbean Football Union U-20 Champions (2015)

Haiti
Caribbean Football Union U-15 Champions (2014)

Russia 
Zvezda-2005 Perm (2009–2010)
UEFA Women's Champions League Round of 16 
Zvezda-2005 Perm (2009–2010)
Supreme League Champions 
USA 
FC Indiana (2008)
US Open Cup Champions

USA 
FC Indiana (2007)
WPSL Champions

USA 
FC Indiana (2005)
WPSL Champions
 
USA 
FC Indiana (2005)
US Open Cup Champions

Individual honors
2008 FieldTurf W-League Coach of the Year
2005 Women's Premier Soccer League Coach of the Year

Coaching tree
Below is a list of coaches who played and/or coached under Shek Borkowski.

 Kaloyan Petkov - Kazakhstan WNT 
 Natalia Zinchenko - Ukraine WNT
 Fiorda Charles - Haiti WNT 
 Lorena Soto - Paraguay WNT 
 Elena Suslova - Zvezda-2005 Perm
 Steve Brdarski - St Bonaventure University
 Craig Roberts - Ball State University
 Michael Voss - Grace College
 Sharolta Nonen - Florida International University
 Kristin Eggert - Liberty University 
 Justin Crew - Ancilla College
 Annie Hamel - Simon Fraser University
 Alicia Schuck - Rollins College

Notable players coached
 Mizuho Sakaguchi, JPN
 Monica Ocampo, MEX
 Fatima Leyva, MEX
 Aivi Luik, AUS
 Lauren Sesselmann, CAN
 Ksenia Tsybutovich, RUS
 Elizabeta Tona, ITA
 Elena Danilova, RUS
 Lisa-Marie Woods, NOR
 Laura del Rio, ESP
 Ria Percival, NZL
 Marie-Eve Nault, CAN
 Sharolta Nonen, CAN

References

External links
Official Puerto Rico Sol website

1963 births
Living people
Polish football managers
People from Rzeszów
Sportspeople from Podkarpackie Voivodeship
Soccer coaches from Indiana
Women's association football managers
Women's national association football team managers